Fundătura River may refer to the following rivers in Romania:

 Fundături, a tributary of the Borșa in Cluj County
 Fundătura River (Bârlad)
 Fundătura River (Tazlăul Sărat)

See also 
 Fundătura (disambiguation)
 Fundoaia River (disambiguation)
 Fundata River